Dicepolia bicolor is a moth in the family Crambidae. It was described by James E. Hayden in 2009. It is found in north-western French Guiana.

The length of the forewings is 6.1–6.9 mm. The basal and postmedial areas as well as the costa of the forewings are dark vinous red. The median area is pale yellow or cream white. The hindwings are pale yellow with a vinous red postmedial area.

Etymology
The species name refers to the forewing colour, with the median area contrasting with the basal and postmedial areas.

References

Moths described in 2009
Odontiinae